Falkenhäger See is a lake in the Mecklenburgische Seenplatte district in Mecklenburg-Vorpommern, Germany. At an elevation of 64.8 m, its surface area is 0.01 km².

Lakes of Germany
Lakes of Mecklenburg-Western Pomerania
Waren (Müritz)